Norm Perry is a retired broadcast journalist. He worked for CBC Radio affiliate CKOY in Ottawa as a reporter and interviewer in the late 1950s with some of his work being picked up by the main network on programs such as Assignment. By the early 1960s he was working for the CBC in Toronto. He moved to CKEY radio in Toronto in the mid-1960s and, later in the decade, he moved to CFTO-TV in Toronto where he hosted a number of programs including the 1968 investigative journalism television series Perry's Probe. He is best known for having been the longest serving host of Canada AM from 1974 to 1990. Following his retirement from Canada AM, Perry moved to CBC Newsworld where he was a Calgary-based host.

External links
 Broadcasting history.ca article about Norm Perry
 

Canadian television news anchors
Year of birth missing (living people)
Living people
CTV Television Network people
Canadian Screen Award winning journalists